Mayor of Podgorica is the head of the City of Podgorica (capital of Montenegro). He acts on behalf of the City, and performs an executive function in the City of Podgorica.

The outgoing current mayor is Ivan Vuković, who was elected in 2018.

List

References

Year of establishment missing